The St. Pierre Park Hotel or St. Pierre Park Hotel & Golf is a hotel and golf course in Saint Peter Port, Guernsey. The hotel is set in 45 acres of mature parkland and contains a 9-hole par 3 golf course (St. Pierre Park Golf Club) designed by Tony Jacklin, 3 tennis courts and a health suite named Le Mirage Health Spa. The hotel is served by The Renoir Restaurant, overlooking the lake and garden of the hotel.

References

External links

Official site

Hotels in Guernsey
Golf clubs and courses in the Channel Islands
Buildings and structures in Saint Peter Port